RTÉjr Radio is a children's news digital radio station of the Irish public-service broadcaster Raidió Teilifís Éireann.

RTÉjr Radio is Ireland's first children's orientated radio station with a wide variety of programming from news, poetry, nursery rhymes, storytelling, dramas and more. The station broadcasts daily between 7:00 and 21:00 (time-sharing the DAB slot with RTÉ Chill) on DAB and Saorview in the Republic of Ireland and globally through the RTÉ Radio Player.

The radio station is complemented by the RTÉjr television channel available on Saorview, Virgin Media Ireland, eVision, Aer TV and Sky Ireland.

On 6 November 2019, RTÉ management announced that, as part of a major cost-saving program, all its digital radio stations would be closed, including RTÉjr Radio. However on 2 March 2021 it was revealed by RTÉ that the broadcaster would close its DAB radio network while retaining its digital radio services.

References

External links
 Official website
 RTÉ press release about the launche of digital stations

Children's radio stations
Radio stations established in 2007
Radio stations in the Republic of Ireland
Junior